Erve Asito, formerly the Polman Stadion, is a multi-use stadium in Almelo, Netherlands. It is currently used mostly for football matches. The stadium has a capacity of 12.080 spectators and was built in 1999. It is the official stadium of Eredivisie side Heracles Almelo. Its pitch is made from artificial turf. 

The stadium was opened on 10 September 1999 followed by the opening match against FC Zwolle. Heracles player Job ten Thije scored the first goal in the Polman Stadium. In 2005 the capacity of the stadium was expanded from 6,900 to 8,500 seats of which 400 are available for the supporters of the visiting team. In 2015 the capacity was expanded to 12,080 seats.

On 1 July 2019, the name of the stadium was changed to Erve Asito as part of a 10-year sponsorship agreement.

References 

Football venues in the Netherlands
Heracles Almelo
Sports venues in Overijssel